William "Billy" Connors is a fictional character appearing in American comic books published by Marvel Comics. He is usually depicted as a supporting character of Spider-Man, and the son of Dr. Curt Connors, also known as the Lizard. Much of his character's story deals with the trauma of his father's uncontrollable powers. Billy was later injected with Curt's Lizard Formula to cure him of a deadly virus, which also mutated him into an anthropomorphic lizard.

Publication history
The character was created by Stan Lee and Steve Ditko and first appeared in The Amazing Spider-Man #6 (November 1963).

Fictional character biography
Billy was born in Florida to Curt and Martha Connors, the former of whom is a biologist. The family moved to New York City so that Curt could continue his research in limb regrowth. The result was that Curt transformed into the Lizard and chased Billy in an attempt to eat him. Luckily, Billy was rescued by Spider-Man who turned his father back to normal with the antidote to the Lizard Formula. 

During a major story arc, Martha and Billy were kidnapped by the Maggia branch led by Silvermane who wanted Curt to decipher an ancient tablet. Once again, Curt transformed into the Lizard and it took the combined effort Spider-Man and the Human Torch save Martha and Billy who were happily reunited with a cured Curt.

At one point, Billy was kidnapped by the villain Stegron who demanded that Curt aid him in reviving a dinosaur army. Spider-Man and  Lizard fought Stegron and saved Billy from a terrible fate.

Curt eventually chose to leave his family greatly saddening Billy and Martha.

However, Curt came back and turned Billy into another lizard creature dubbed Lizard Jr., but the two were captured and turned back to normal by Spider-Man.

Sometime later, Curt mentions that Martha and Billy contracted cancer. Martha died while Billy survived, but was forced to live with his aunt.

During The Gauntlet and Grim Hunt storyline, Lizard finally devoured Billy resulting in Lizard becoming a creature called the Shed.

In a lead-up to the Dead No More: The Clone Conspiracy storyline, Billy was revived by Miles Warren, along with Martha, to motivate Curt to work for him. When New U Technologies suddenly breaks out in a melee, Billy and Martha are taken away by Curt, who claims that he can cure them of the Carrion Virus. Billy and Martha are injected with the Lizard Formula, which saves their lives, but also mutates them into anthropomorphic lizards.

While Billy and his family have begun to live peacefully in the sewers, getting occasional friendly visits from Peter Parker and Mary Jane Watson, he has started to openly talk of his longing to visit the outside world and attend a regular school; adding that kids with unusual appearances and abilities have begun going as well. Despite this, his father angrily rebuffs his pleas and he, in turn, has started to rebel. He is later captured and used as a hostage by Kraven the Hunter as part of Kraven's efforts to test his cloned 'offspring' and provoke Spider-Man into becoming the 'hunter' Kraven feels his enemy should be. When trapped in a cage with Curt, Spider-Man learns that Curt took Billy to Doctor Strange after his resurrection, who confirmed that, for reasons he cannot understand, Billy is not 'just' a clone of the original one, but is actually Billy's soul reborn in his cloned body, driving Curt to be willing to take any measures necessary to protect his son.

Other versions

Ultimate Marvel
In the Ultimate Marvel Universe, Billy lives with his mother due to her divorcing Curt.

What If?
In an issue of What If? that asks "What If Spider-Man Killed the Lizard?", Billy learns that his father was the Lizard and swears revenge on Spider-Man for murdering him. Billy intentionally amputates his arm to be like his father and is later visited by Calypso who gives him an elixir that transforms him into another lizard monster.

In other media

Television
 Billy appeared in the 1960s Spider-Man series, voiced by Billie Mae Richards. Here, he is named Billy Conner.
 Billy Connors appears in the 1990s Spider-Man series, voiced by Toby Scott Ganger.
 Billy Connors appears in The Spectacular Spider-Man, voiced by Max Burkholder. This version is a young kid with a very positive view on life, who often hangs out at the lab where his scientist parents work. Billy is the first to realize that his father is transforming into a lizard and fears that his father would forget him. When Connors finally transforms into the Lizard, Billy tries to appeal to his human side which is enough for Spider-Man to feed him the formula to change him back. In the episode "Final Curtain", Billy and his family are forced to move to Florida after Miles Warren blackmails Curt by threatening to reveal his Lizard experiments to the board of education if Curt revealed Miles' involvement with the supervillain community.

Film
 Billy Connors appears in a deleted scene of The Amazing Spider-Man, played by Miles Elliot. In the scene, Curt visits Billy at the bus stop to inform him that he is "going away for a while" and tells him that he and Martha were wrong about "not striking back", causing some confusion for Billy.

References

External links
 Billy Connors at Marvel Wiki

Anthropomorphic reptiles
Characters created by Stan Lee
Characters created by Steve Ditko
Comics characters introduced in 1963
Fictional characters from Florida
Fictional characters with superhuman durability or invulnerability
Fictional human–animal hybrids
Fictional reptilians
Marvel Comics animals
Marvel Comics characters who can move at superhuman speeds
Marvel Comics characters with accelerated healing
Marvel Comics characters with superhuman strength
Marvel Comics hybrids
Marvel Comics mutates
Spider-Man characters